Irina Valeryevna Podshibyakina (born 5 July 1995) is a Russian footballer who plays as a defender and has appeared for the Russia women's national team.

Career
Podshibyakina has been capped for the Russia national team, appearing for the team during the 2019 FIFA Women's World Cup qualifying cycle.

References

External links
 
 
 

1995 births
Living people
Russian women's footballers
Russia women's international footballers
Women's association football defenders
FC Zorky Krasnogorsk (women) players
Zvezda 2005 Perm players
CSP Izmailovo players